John Payak Jr. (November 20, 1926 – February 27, 2009) was a National Basketball Association player for the Philadelphia Warriors, Waterloo Hawks, and Milwaukee Hawks.

Born in Rossford, Ohio, Payak graduated from Woodward High School in Toledo in 1944 and then attended Bowling Green State University, graduating in 1949 after an interruption for service in the United States Navy. Payak was a 6'4" shooting guard. Payak played for the Philadelphia Warriors and Waterloo Hawks during the 1949-50 season, and for the Milwaukee Hawks in 1952-53.  He also played with the Toledo Mercuries, a traveling team that competed against the Harlem Globetrotters at various exhibitions.

He followed his retirement as a player as a basketball referee, officiating for over 17 years in the Big Ten Conference, the Mid-America Conference and in NCAA tournament action. He also served as Supervisor of Basketball Referees for the Mid-American Conference. Payak was elected to the Bowling Green State University Athletic Hall of Fame, the Toledo City Athletic Hall of Fame, and the National Polish-American Sports Hall of Fame. He died February 27, 2009, in Toledo, Ohio.

References

External links 
 John Payak page, National Polish-American Sports Hall of Fame

1926 births
2009 deaths
American men's basketball players
American people of Polish descent
Basketball players from Ohio
Bowling Green Falcons men's basketball players
College men's basketball referees in the United States
Milwaukee Hawks players
People from Rossford, Ohio
Philadelphia Warriors players
Shooting guards
Undrafted National Basketball Association players
United States Navy personnel of World War II
Waterloo Hawks players